Joel Brunker (born 22 February 1986 in Richmond, New South Wales) is a former featherweight boxer from Australia. He competed at the 2004 Summer Olympics in Athens, Greece.  He was eliminated in the first round of the men's bantamweight division (– 54 kg) by eventual bronze medalist Aghasi Mammadov. 

He was an Australian Institute of Sport scholarship holder.

Professional boxing record 

| style="text-align:center;" colspan="8"|30 Wins (20 knockouts, 10 decisions), 4 Losses, 0 Draws
|-  style="text-align:center; background:#e3e3e3;"
|  style="border-style:none none solid solid; "|Res.
|  style="border-style:none none solid solid; "|Record
|  style="border-style:none none solid solid; "|Opponent
|  style="border-style:none none solid solid; "|Type
|  style="border-style:none none solid solid; "|Rd., Time
|  style="border-style:none none solid solid; "|Date
|  style="border-style:none none solid solid; "|Location
|  style="border-style:none none solid solid; "|Notes
|- align=center
|Win
|31–2
|align=left| Jason Butar Butar
|TKO
|
|
|align=left|
|align=left|
|- align=center
|Win
|30–2
|align=left| Decha Janthasri
|KO
|
|
|align=left|
|align=left|
|- align=center
|Win
|29–2
|align=left| Phum Kunmat
|UD
|
|
|align=left|
|align=left|
|- align=center
|Loss
|28–2
|align=left| Josh Warrington
|UD
|
|
|align=left|
|align=left|
|- align=center
|Win
|28–1
|align=left| Rey Las Pinas
|TKO
|
|
|align=left|
|align=left|
|- align=center
|Loss
|27–1
|align=left| Lee Selby
|TKO
|
|
|align=left|
|align=left|
|- align=center
|Win
|27–0
|align=left| Mike Oliver
|UD
|
|
|align=left|
|align=left|
|- align=center
|Win
|26–0
|align=left| Maxsaisai Sithsaithong
|KO
|
|
|align=left|
|align=left|
|- align=center
|Win
|25–0
|align=left| Ivan Hernández
|UD
|
|
|align=left|
|align=left|
|- align=center
|Win
|24–0
|align=left| Carlos Fulgencio
|KO
|
|
|align=left|
|align=left|
|- align=center
|Win
|23–0
|align=left| Edgar Riovalle
|UD
|
|
|align=left|
|align=left|
|- align=center
|Win
|22–0
|align=left| Matt Powell
|UD
|
|
|align=left|
|align=left|
|- align=center
|Win
|21–0
|align=left| Adones Aguelo
|UD
|
|
|align=left|
|align=left|
|- align=center
|Win
|20–0
|align=left| Reynaldo Belandres
|UD
|
|
|align=left|
|align=left|
|- align=center
|Win
|19–0
|align=left| Freddie Martinez
|KO
|
|
|align=left|
|align=left|
|- align=center
|Win
|18–0
|align=left| Marangin Marbun
|RTD
|
|
|align=left|
|align=left|
|- align=center
|Win
|17–0
|align=left| Roberto Lerio
|TKO
|
|
|align=left|
|align=left|
|- align=center
|Win
|16–0
|align=left| Carlos Lopez
|KO
|
|
|align=left|
|align=left|
|- align=center
|Win
|15–0
|align=left| Ernie Gonzales Jr
|TKO
|
|
|align=left|
|align=left|
|- align=center
|Win
|14–0
|align=left| Dianever Orcales
|TD
|
|
|align=left|
|align=left|
|- align=center
|Win
|13–0
|align=left| Manu Emery
|TKO
|
|
|align=left|
|align=left|
|- align=center
|Win
|12–0
|align=left| Kongfah Singwancha
|TKO
|
|
|align=left|
|align=left|
|- align=center
|Win
|11–0
|align=left| Mongkolchai Patavikorngym
|KO
|
|
|align=left|
|align=left|
|- align=center
|Win
|10–0
|align=left| Ernie Gonzales Jr
|UD
|
|
|align=left|
|align=left|
|- align=center
|Win
|9–0
|align=left| Roel Mangan
|MD
|
|
|align=left|
|align=left|
|- align=center
|Win
|8–0
|align=left| Flash Villacura
|UD
|
|
|align=left|
|align=left|
|- align=center
|Win
|7–0
|align=left| Kartu Arang
|KO
|
|
|align=left|
|align=left|
|- align=center
|Win
|6–0
|align=left| Percy Samson 
|TKO
|
|
|align=left|
|align=left|
|- align=center
|Win
|5–0
|align=left| Dan Cody
|KO
|
|
|align=left|
|align=left|
|- align=center
|Win
|4–0
|align=left| Troy Glover
|TKO
|
|
|align=left|
|align=left|
|- align=center
|Win
|3–0
|align=left| Kane Buckley
|UD
|
|
|align=left|
|align=left|
|- align=center
|Win
|2–0
|align=left| Steve Storic
|TKO
|
|
|align=left|
|align=left|
|- align=center
|Win
|1–0
|align=left| Emanuel Micallef
|UD
|
|
|align=left|
|align=left|
|- align=center

References

sports-reference

1986 births
Living people
Bantamweight boxers
Boxers at the 2004 Summer Olympics
Olympic boxers of Australia
Australian Institute of Sport boxers
Australian male boxers
Boxers from Sydney